Reg is a one-off BBC Television fact-based drama about the campaign by Reg Keys to obtain answers following the death of his son Tom in the Iraq War, by standing in the 2005 general election as an anti-war independent candidate in Sedgefield, a constituency held by the then Prime Minister, Tony Blair.

Production
Keys was portrayed by Academy Award-nominated actor Tim Roth and the programme was scripted by Jimmy McGovern. Talking on BBC radio programme Front Row in June 2016 about creating the drama, McGovern said: "I first thought about it over 8 years ago and I went down to see Reg and I tried to start it, but for some reason I just couldn't seem to start it. But it was always at the back of my mind: 'I know I've got to tell this man's story'". Of his main protagonist, McGovern has said "It was an honour to meet Reg Keys. He is a truly remarkable man, and it has been a privilege to tell this part of his story."

Cast
The cast of Reg included:

 Tim Roth as Reg Keys
 Anna Maxwell Martin as Sally Keys
 Elliott Tittensor as Richard Keys
 Ralph Brown as Bob Clay
 Zac Fox as Tom Keys
 Charlie Anson as Major Bryn Parry Jones
 David Westhead as Tony Blair's minder
 David Yelland as Martin Bell
 Tim Bentinck as Frederick Forsyth
 Kevin Doyle as Returning Officer

The Male Voice Choir featured in the choir rehearsal scene and in the funeral scene were Cor Meibion Y Fflint / Flint Male Voice Choir

Awards and nominations

Critical reception
In The Daily Telegraph Jasper Rees found Reg to be "a meticulous autopsy of a vast insult to the British body politic", noting "McGovern knows where to find the drama in stories of private grief battling institutional indifference" and adding "This was a quiet portrait of simmering rage, sometimes a bit too quiet. […] The Keys' Brummie  stoicism was the cause of much understated acting – Roth was doggedly undemonstrative, Maxwell Martin temperate and reserved."

Writing in The Guardian, Lucy Mangan began by saying "I don't know where Jimmy McGovern gets the emotional energy or resilience from, I really don't" before judging that "There wasn't a weak moment in the film". Mangan found Anna Maxwell Martin "as quietly stellar as always" and that "Roth was extraordinary as a man scoured out by grief and left with only a single purpose to pursue. Implacable, purged of all need or desire for lesser considerations or emotions by his loss, he gave us a man and a performance boiled down to its very essence. There is nothing more honestly, nakedly powerful or moving. Thank you."

References

External links 
 Official BBC page
 
 Official Flint Male Voice Choir Page

British docudrama films
2016 films
2010s political drama films
British political drama films
Films directed by David Blair (director)
2010s British films
2010s English-language films